Mange Temple is a Buddhist temple located in Jinghong of Xishuangbanna Dai Autonomous Prefecture, Yunnan, China. Built in 1477, the temple is one of the oldest temples in Xishuangbanna Dai Autonomous Prefecture.

History
According to historic records, the temple was first built in 1477, in the 13th year of Chenghua period (1465–1487) in the Ming dynasty (1368–1644), with a history of more than 500 years.

Architecture
The temple consists of more than 7 buildings. The complex includes the following halls: Main Hall, Scripture Hall, Monk's Houses, Drum tower, Ordination Hall, corridors and door kiosks.

Main Hall
The spectacular Dai style roof is high and steep in slopes because it is surrounded by 16 red painted ailanthus wood columns with lacquered flower patterns. They are decorated with dedicate and beautiful sparrow braces and hanging fascia. The ceiling is drawn with pretty patterns with phenomenal Dai style characteristic. On the walls are paintings with stories of Sakyamuni's becoming Buddha, which are bright in color, fluent in lines and with the style of Dai frescos. They are covered with colorful frescos depicting the vivid and lively images of Chinese dragons, white elephants, phoenixes, peacocks and female celestials.

The various statues of Buddha and animals are placed in front of the statue of Sakyamuni. Before the statue of Sakyamuni, long flags which are known as Dong in Dai language are hung from the beams,  in length, they have colorful patterns and flying silver and gold foil streamers hanging down from the beams.

Ordination Hall 

References

Buildings and structures in Jinghong
Buddhist temples in Yunnan
Tourist attractions in Jinghong
1470s establishments in Asia
15th-century Buddhist temples
Religious buildings and structures completed in 1477
15th-century establishments in China